William James Jackson (27 January 1876 – 25 March 1954) was a Welsh footballer. His regular position was as an inside forward. He was born in Flint, Flintshire. He played for Flint, Rhyl, St Helens Recs, Newton Heath, Barrow, Burnley, Wigan County and Chester, where he made his début in an 8–0 win over Rhyl in October 1905. He won one cap for the Welsh national team in March 1899.

References

External links
MUFCInfo.com profile

1876 births
1954 deaths
Association football forwards
Barrow A.F.C. players
Burnley F.C. players
Chester City F.C. players
Flint Town United F.C. players
Manchester United F.C. players
People from Flint, Flintshire
Sportspeople from Flintshire
Rhyl F.C. players
St Helens Recreation RLFC players
English Football League players
Wales international footballers
Welsh footballers
Wigan County F.C. players